Sayt'uqucha may refer to:

 Sayt'uqucha (Lampa), a lake in Peru
 Sayt'uqucha (San Román), a lake in Peru
 Sayt'uqucha (Sandia), a lake in Peru